The next Jharkhand legislative assembly election is scheduled to be held in November–December 2024 to elect all 81 members of the Jharkhand Legislative Assembly. Hemant Soren is the incumbent Chief Minister of Jharkhand.

Background 
The tenure of Jharkhand Legislative Assembly is scheduled to end on 5 January 2025. The previous assembly elections were held in November–December 2019. After the election, a coalition of Jharkhand Mukti Morcha, Indian National Congress and Rashtriya Janata Dal formed the state government, with Hemant Soren becoming Chief Minister.

Schedule

Parties and alliances







References

State Assembly elections in Jharkhand
Jharkhand